A misericord (sometimes named mercy seat, like the biblical object) is a small wooden structure formed on the underside of a folding seat in a church which, when the seat is folded up, is intended to act as a shelf to support a person in a partially standing position during long periods of prayer.

Origins
Prayers in the early medieval church at the daily divine offices (i.e. Matins, Lauds, Prime, Terce, Sext, None, Vespers, and Compline) were said standing with uplifted hands. The old or infirm could use crutches or, as time went on, a misericordia (literally "pity of the heart" to create an act of mercy). For these times of required standing, seating was constructed so that the seats could be turned up. However, the undersides sometimes had a small shelf, a misericord, allowing the user to lean against it, slightly reducing their discomfort. Like most other medieval woodwork in churches, they were usually skilfully carved and often show detailed scenes, despite being hidden underneath the seats, especially in the choir stalls of the choir around the altar.

History
The earliest mention of the misericord dates to the 11th century. Surviving misericords in English churches date from the start of the 13th century right up until the 21st century, although after the beginning of the 17th century they are viewed as modern copies with little or no historical importance. Remnant's 1969 catalogue dismisses everything after that date as "modern", rarely even affording it a description, but there are many wonderful carvings from the Victorian era, and even the modern day. The earliest set of misericords can be found in the choir stalls of Exeter Cathedral and date from the middle of the 13th century. The vast majority of English misericords date from the 14th and 15th centuries and are curiously most often depictions of secular or pagan images and scenes, entirely at odds with the Christian iconography and aesthetic that surround them.

Many stalls with misericords were once part of monastic or collegiate churches, but under the Reformation many were either destroyed or broken up to be dispersed amongst parish churches. Those that survived were further depleted by 17th-century iconoclasts and Victorian reformers. One set at Chester was destroyed by Dean Howson because he deemed it improper, although 43 of the original medieval scenes remain. The woodcarvers came from Lincoln in the late 14th century and moved on to Westminster Hall when they had finished the choir, three years later. It is said  that it was the apprentices who were allowed to carve the seats, while the masters did the more impressive works.

Eastern Orthodox Use
Misericords are found to this day on kathismata, the choir stalls used by Eastern Orthodox monastics. These tend to be much simpler than their Western counterparts, usually being a simple strip of rounded wood with little or no ornamentation. Their use is very common in the Greek Orthodox Church, though Russian Orthodox monasteries tend not to have individual choir stalls, but simple benches for the brethren to sit on. Orthodox Christians stand throughout the long divine services, rather than sit or kneel, though some seating is provided for the elderly and infirm. Whereas Greek monks will tend to lean in their stalls during the services, Russian monks usually stand upright.

Misericord (room)
A distinct (but related) use of the word is to denote a room in a medieval Benedictine monastery where some part of the community would eat on any given day. The Rule of Saint Benedict included strict rules on the food allowed for monks in the refectory: for example, it provided for a complete ban on the meat of four-legged animals except for the sick. In a late medieval monastery, a schedule would send half of all monks to dine in the refectory, and the other half to the misericord, where the Rule of Saint Benedict was not in effect and they could indulge in meat. At Westminster Abbey, the misericord was constructed sometime between 1230 and 1270.

Cultural impact
As the 'hidden' position and 'vernacular' iconography of misericords have prompted them to be seen as a subversive art-form, they have re-appeared as motifs in modern art and literature

Gallery

See also
 
Mourner's bench
Prie-dieu

References

Remnant, G. L. (1969). Misericords in Great Britain; with an essay on their iconography by Mary D. Anderson. (re-issue 1998). Oxford University Press.

Further reading
Elaine C. Block, Corpus of Medieval Misericords in France: XIII – XVI century. (2003) 
Elaine C. Block, Corpus of Medieval Misericords Iberia: Portugal – Spain XIII-XVI. (2004) 
Elaine C. Block, Corpus of Medieval Misericords: Belgium (B) – Netherlands (NL). (2010) 
Elaine C. Block, Misericords in the Rhineland. (1996) 
Michael Camille, Image on the Edge: The Margins of Medieval Art. (1992) 
Gordon Emery, Curious Chester (1999) 
Gordon Emery, Chester Inside Out (1998) 
Gordon Emery, The Chester Guide (2003) 
Christa Grössinger, The World Upside Down: English misericords. (1997) 
Paul Hardwick, English Medieval Misericords: the margins of meaning. (2011)  
Dorothy and Henry Kraus, The Gothic Choirstalls of Spain. (1986) 
Dorothy and Henry Kraus, The Hidden World of Misericords. (1975) 
Fernando López-Ríos Fernández, Arte y medicina en las misericordias de los coros españoles (1991)

External links

 A Handbook of Medieval Misericords
 Misericords of the world – Photos, descriptions and histories of thousands of misericords.

Seats
Church architecture
Liturgy of the Hours
Christian prayer
Eastern Christian liturgical objects
Catholic liturgy